The Honda Pilot is an all-terrain vehicle produced by the Honda Motor Company in 1989 and 1990.  This vehicle is also known as the FL400R, the model number assigned to this vehicle by Honda.

Its body style was based on the earlier Honda Odyssey model and was the last ATV manufactured in this style.  The Honda Pilot features a full roll cage and four-point safety harness.

References

Pilot(ATV)